Percy Standing was an English film actor of the silent era.

Selected filmography

 Life Without Soul (1915)
 My Four Years in Germany (1918)
 To the Highest Bidder (1918)
 Should a Husband Forgive? (1919)
 The Great Day (1920)
 The Island of Wisdom (1920)
 Appearances (1921)
 The Mystery Road (1921)
 Sheer Bluff (1922)
 A Gipsy Cavalier (1923)
 The Harbour Lights (1923)
 The Final Problem (1923)
 Aaron's Rod (1923)
 Fires of Fate (1923)
 Becket (1924)
 Harmony Heaven (1930)
 The Flame of Love (1930)
 Colonel Blood (1934)

References

External links

still picture of Alice Joyce and Percy Standing in To the Highest Bidder(1918)(courtesy GretaDeGroat)

1882 births
1950 deaths
English male film actors
English male silent film actors
20th-century English male actors
Standing family